Najafabad (also Romanized as Najafābād; also known as Gūrdarāz and Gūr Derāz) is a village in Zalian Rural District, Zalian District, Shazand County, Markazi Province, Iran. At the 2006 census, its population was 139, in 43 families.

References 

Populated places in Shazand County